Large Interferometer For Exoplanets (LIFE) is a project started in 2017 to develop the science, technology and a roadmap for a space mission to detect and characterize the atmospheres of dozens of warm, terrestrial extrasolar planets. The current plan is for a nulling interferometer operating in the mid-infrared.

The LIFE space observatory concept is different from previous space missions, which covered a similar wavelength regime in the mid-infrared (MIR). This includes recent missions such as  James Web Space Telescope, Spitzer Space Telescope, and older missions such as ISO, IRAS, and AKARI.

Atmospheric Biosignatures 
When present in sufficient quantities in the atmosphere, chemicals that are indicators of life are known as atmospheric biomarkers. The LIFE Mission is designed to observe in the mid-infrared light, where many of these molecules show spectral features.

LIFE research papers 

 Improved exoplanet detection yield estimates for a large mid-infrared space-interferometer mission 
 Signal simulation, signal extraction and fundamental exoplanet parameters from single epoch observations
 Spectral resolution, wavelength range and sensitivity requirements based on atmospheric retrieval analyses of an exo-Earth  
 Diagnostic potential of a mid-infrared space-interferometer for studying Earth analogs 
 Ideal kernel-nulling array architectures for a space-based mid-infrared nulling interferometer
 Practical implementation of a kernel-nulling beam combiner with a discussion on instrumental uncertainties and redundancy benefits

References

External links
Exoplanet science with a space-based mid-infrared nulling interferometer, Sascha P. Quanz, Jens Kammerer, Denis Defrère, Olivier Absil, Adrian M. Glauser, Daniel Kitzmann, 9 Aug 2018

See also 
 Astrobiology
 Biosignature

Space telescopes
Exoplanet search projects
Proposed satellites